This is a list of notable people who were born in or have been residents of the town of Kettering, in the county of Northamptonshire, England.

Academia
 Maurice Kendall – statistician, widely known for his contribution to statistics
 Henry Nettleship – classical scholar
 Dame Sarah Gilbert - Saïd Professor of Vaccinology at the University of Oxford

Entertainment
 James Acaster – comedian
 Robert Ames – conductor and violist, who holds the positions of co-Artistic Director and co-Principal Conductor of the London Contemporary Orchestra
 David Armand – comedian, actor and writer
 Jayne Conneely - DJane, record producer, co-founder and former manager of the record label Metalheadz
 Hugh Dennis – comedian, actor, writer, impressionist and voice-over artist
 Sienna Guillory – actress and former model
 David Hawthorne – stage and film actor
 Jim King – original member of the British rock band Family
 Jack Lucien – British-born Andorran singer, music producer, and songwriter, best known for his 2009 single I'm Not Afraid
 Valerie Olukemi A "Kemi" Olusanya - DJane, record producer, co-founder and former manager of the record label Metalheadz
 Horace Panter – bassist for the 2 Tone ska band The Specials
 Russ Russell – record producer, sound engineer, mixer, mastering engineer, musician and writer
 Chris Smith – radio newsreader, most famous for presenting Newsbeat on BBC Radio 1
 Faryl Smith – soprano
 Mae Stephens – singer and songwriter
 Temples – rock band

Military
 Raymond Lewin GC – Pilot Officer of the Royal Air Force Volunteer Reserve (RAFVR) was (whilst a Sergeant) awarded the George Cross for the courage he showed in rescuing his co-pilot from their burning plane on 3 November 1940 in Malta
 Edward Sismore DSO DFC Two Bars AFC AE – Air Commodore

Miscellaneous
 Michael Kidner – pioneer of Op art
 Ron Chippindale – Chief Inspector of Air Accidents in charge of the New Zealand Office of Air Accidents Investigations
 Alfred East – painter
 John Alfred Gotch – architect and architectural historian
 Thomas Cooper Gotch – painter and book illustrator loosely associated with the Pre-Raphaelite movement
 Catherine Hall – feminist historian  
 Jack Laundon – lichenologist, who became President of the British Lichen Society
 Edward Nettleship FRS FCS - ophthalmologist
 John Trivett Nettleship – artist, known as a painter of animals and in particular lions, he was also an author and book illustrator
 Samuel Perkins Pick – architect strongly associated with Leicestershire, and co-founder of the architecture and civil engineering firm Pick Everard
 Royston (Roy) Warner Wilson - (1900-1965) - (famous Amalgamated Press comic artist)

Politics
 Tom Bradley – British politician
 Henry Briggs – Australian politician, a Member of the Western Australian Legislative Council for 23 years, and its President for 13 years.
 Andy Sawford – Labour and Co-operative Party politician 
 Phil Sawford – Labour Party politician, who was the Member of Parliament (MP) for Kettering from 1997 to 2005

Religion
 Thomas Allen – clergyman and divine
 John Brine – Particular Baptist minister
 Andrew Fuller – Particular Baptist minister and theologian  
 John Gill – Baptist pastor, biblical scholar, and theologian
 William Knibb – Baptist minister and missionary to Jamaica, chiefly known today for his work to free slaves

Sport
 Dermot Bailey - professional wheelchair tennis player
 Nick Coles – cricketer
 Sean Dyche - former professional footballer, former manager of Burnley Football Club, current manager of Everton F.C.
 Ricky Evans - darts player
 Harry Gouldstone - cricketer
 Charley Hull - professional golfer (birthplace)
 Angela Hunter – international track and road racing cyclist
 Kyren Wilson - snooker player

Writer/ journalist
 Frank Bellamy – comics artist, best known for his work on the Eagle comic
 J. L. Carr – English novelist, publisher, teacher and eccentric            
 Jane E. Clarke – writer of children's books and poetry
 Jill McGown – writer of mystery novels
 Keith Roberts – science fiction author

References